Francis Joseph Beckman (October 25, 1875 – October 17, 1948) was an American prelate of the Roman Catholic Church. He served as bishop of the Diocese of Lincoln in Nebraska (1924–1930) and as archbishop of the Archdiocese of Dubuque in Iowa (1930–1946).

Biography

Early life 
Francis Beckman was born on October 25, 1875, in Cincinnati, Ohio, to Francis and Elizabeth (née Fenker) Beckman. He studied at St. Gregory's Preparatory Seminary and Mount St. Mary's Seminary in Cincinnati.  He then attended the University of Louvain in Leuven, Belgium, and the Pontifical Gregorian University in Rome.

Priesthood 
He was ordained to the priesthood on June 20, 1902. Following his ordination, he received a Licentiate of Sacred Theology (1907) and later a Doctor of Sacred Theology (1908) from the Gregorian.

After his return to Cincinnati, Beckman joined the faculty of Mount St. Mary's Seminary, where he served as professor of philosophy and dogmatic theology (1908–1912). He was rector of Mount St. Mary's from 1912 to 1924. He also served as Censor Librorum and a consultor for the Archdiocese of Cincinnati.

Bishop of Lincoln 
On December 23, 1923, Beckman was appointed the fourth bishop of Lincoln by Pope Pius XI. He received his episcopal consecration on May 1, 1924, from Archbishop Henry Moeller of Cincinnati.  Bishops Joseph Schrembs of Cleveland and Joseph Chartrand of Indianapolis were the principal co-consecrators. Beckman served the diocese for almost six years.  During his time in Lincoln, he served as apostolic administrator of the Diocese of Omaha from June 1926 to July 1928.

Archbishop of Dubuque 
Pope Pius XI appointed Bishop Beckman Archbishop of Dubuque on January 17, 1930. Beckman shepherded the archdiocese through the Great Depression and World War II. During his tenure as archbishop, the St. Vincent de Paul Society, the Holy Name Societies, National Catholic Rural Life Conference, Conference on Industrial Relations, and the Catholic Youth Organization grew with his support. The Catholic Student's Mission Crusade, which he founded while in Cincinnati, held its 1935 convention in Dubuque. In 1939, the archdiocese's Columbia College in Dubuque was renamed Loras College in honor of Dubuque's first bishop, Mathias Loras.

Impressed with Catholic culture he had seen in Europe, Beckman began to collect fine art pieces.  He started with a small collection of artifacts belonging to Father William Kessler at Columbia Academy in Dubuque. Beckman placed several art pieces in a museum at Columbia College.  The Beckman collection, including works of Winslow Homer, Rembrandt, Rubens, and Van Dyck, was valued at $1.5 million.

In 1936, promoter Phillip Suetter sold Beckman on the idea of investing borrowed money in gold mines. Beckman perhaps thought that he could gain funds to further his art collection. Instead, he involved the archdiocese in what turned out to be a fraudulent gold mine scheme. Beckman signed promissory notes on behalf of the archdiocese.  When scheme fell apart and Suetter was arrested, the archdiocese lost its investment. President Franklin Roosevelt directed the FBI to investigate Beckman to determine the extent of his  involvement in the scam, not because of Beckman's opposition to the president as some believed. Soon the holders of the notes began demanding repayment. The archdiocese sold Beckman's art collection to help pay off the notes. The ultimate loss to the archdiocese was over $500,000.

As a result of all of Beckman's problems, on June 15, 1944, Pope Pius XII appointed Bishop Henry Rohlman of Davenport as coadjutor archbishop and apostolic administrator. Beckman remained archbishop of Dubuque, but it was made clear to him that actual authority rested with Rohlman.

Retirement and legacy 
Beckman remained archbishop of Dubuque until Pope Pius XII named him titular archbishop of Phulli and accepted his retirement on November 11, 1946.  Following his retirement, Beckman moved from Dubuque to Cincinnati, Ohio.

Francis Beckman died at the Alexian Brothers Hospital in Chicago, Illinois, on October 17, 1948, at age 72. He was buried in the mortuary chapel of Saint Raphael's Cathedral in Dubuque.

Viewpoints

Popular culture 
Beckman began a campaign against swing music in 1938. He made headlines when he spoke before the National Council of Catholic Women in October and openly denounced it as "a degenerated musical system... turned loose to gnaw away the moral fiber of young people" which would lead one down a "primrose path to Hell."

Foreign policy 
Beckman adopted a pacifist stance in the years before World War II. He wrote an open letter to Senator William Borah of Idaho encouraging him in his efforts to maintain American neutrality. At a rally on October 20, 1939, Beckman supported noted radio priest Father Charles Coughlin in his stand for peace. The next week, Beckman went on the radio with Coughlin and said that the Communists wanted the U.S. to enter the war so that, worn out by the war, Americans would become more susceptible to communist thought. He made numerous speeches against U.S. involvement in the war until Pearl Harbor was attacked by the Japanese in December 1941.

References

External links

1875 births
1948 deaths
Religious leaders from Cincinnati
Roman Catholic Archdiocese of Cincinnati
20th-century Roman Catholic archbishops in the United States
Roman Catholic bishops of Lincoln
Roman Catholic archbishops of Dubuque